Nørrebrohallen (English: the hall of Nørrebro) is a Danish sports complex in Nørrebro, Copenhagen. It was formerly known as Nørrebro Remise (English: Nørrebro Roundhouse) because it worked as a roundhouse for the now-defunct Copenhagen Tram until 1972 when all tram activities stopped. The facility is owned and run by the Copenhagen Municipality. The oldest part of the facility was drawn by architect Thorvald Sørensen and was constructed by Siemens & Halske-Bahnabteilung in 1896. Nørrebrohallen was expanded several times since; amongst others by Vilhelm Friederichsen from 1900–1902. Furthermore, the professional Danish Basketball club Stevnsgade Basketball play their home matches in Hal 3 in Nørrebrohallen. Hal 3 has a capacity of approx. 600 people.

External links
2200.kultur.kk.dk (Danish)

Sports venues in Copenhagen
Handball venues in Denmark
Indoor arenas in Denmark
Nørrebro